The Wild Bees is a 2001 Czech film directed by Bohdan Sláma. It was the Czech Republic's submission to the 75th Academy Awards for the Academy Award for Best Foreign Language Film, but was not accepted as a nominee.

Cast 
 Zdeněk Raušer - Kája
 Tatiana Vilhelmová - Božka
 Marek Daniel - Petr
 Vanda Hybnerová - Jana
 Pavel Liška - Laďa
  - Tata
  - Babi
 Zuzana Kronerová - Lisajová

See also

Cinema of the Czech Republic
List of Czech submissions for Academy Award for Best Foreign Language Film

References

External links

2001 films
Czech comedy-drama films
2000s Czech-language films
2000s Czech films